Nova Guataporanga is a municipality in the state of São Paulo in Brazil. The population is 2,325 (2020 est.) in an area of 34.2 km². The elevation is 382 m.

References

Municipalities in São Paulo (state)